Alfredo Zitarrosa (March 10, 1936 – January 17, 1989) was a Uruguayan singer-songwriter, poet and journalist. He specialized in Uruguayan and Argentinean folk genres such as zamba and milonga, and he became a chief figure in the nueva canción movement in his country. A staunch supporter of Communist ideals, he lived in exile between 1976 and 1984. He is widely regarded as one of the most influential singer-songwriters of Latin America.

Biography 
Zitarrosa was born as the illegitimate son of 19-year-old Jesusa Blanca Nieve Iribarne (Blanca), in 143 Carlos Maria Ramírez Ave.Belvedere neighborhood, Montevideo, and was enrolled at The Pereira Rossell Hospital,after. 

Shortly after being born, Blanca handed over her son to be raised by Carlos Durán, a man of many trades, and his wife, Doraisella Carbajal, then employed at the Council for Children, becoming Alfredo "Pocho" Durán. They lived in several cities neighbourhoods, and moved between 1944 and the end of 1947, they moved to the town of Santiago Vázquez. They frequently visited the countryside near Trinidad, capital city of the Flores Department, where Alfredo's adoptive mother was born. This childhood experience stayed with him forever, notably in his repertoire, the majority of which contains rhythms and songs of peasant origin, mainly milongas.

Alfredo briefly returned with his adoptive family, to Montevideo and in early adolescence, moved on to live with his biological mother and her husband, the Argentine Alfredo Nicolás Zitarrosa, who would eventually give him his surname. Together with his newborn sister, they lived in the area now known as Rincón de la Bolsa, at km. 29.50 of the old route to Colonia, San José Department. Based there, he commuted to study at the High School in Montevideo, where he eventually moved into his early youth. First he lived with the Duráns and then in Mrs. Ema's pension, located at Colonia and Medanos (today Barrios Amorín) streets, to fill after the famous attic of the house which was used as a pension and was owned by Blanca Iribarne, his mother, located on Yaguarón street (today Aquiles Lanza) 1021, in front of the plaza currently bearing his name nearby the Central Cemetery. He worked, among other duties, as a seller of furniture, subscriptions to a medical society, clerical and in a print shop. Some time later -his first employer recalls with special affection- a certain Pachelo, which was introduced by one of his colleagues in their usual trip to Montevideo daily shipments during his high school years.

He began his artistic career in 1954, as a radio broadcaster, entering as a presenter and entertainer, librettist and informativist, or even as an actor. He was also a writer, poet, and journalist, working for the famous weekly newspaper Marcha.

While he was in Peru, forced by circumstances and somewhat fortuitously, he made his professional debut as a singer. This occurred on February 20, 1964, in a program on Channel 13, Panamericana Television, thus beginning an uninterrupted career. Zitarrosa once recalled this experience: "No tenía ni un peso, pero sí muchos amigos. Uno de ellos, César Durand, regenteaba una agencia de publicidad y por sorpresa me incluyó en un programa de TV, y me obligó a cantar. Canté dos temas y cobré 50 dólares. Fue una sorpresa para mí, que me permitió reunir algunos pesos…" ("I had no money, but I had many friends. One of them, Cesar Durand, happened to manage a publicity agency and I was included in a TV program, and forced to sing. I was paid 50 dollars for two songs. It was a surprise for me, and it allowed me to earn some money…")

Shortly thereafter, going back to Bolivia by Uruguay, he conducted several programs on Radio Altiplano of La Paz, debuting later in Montevideo, back in 1965, in the auditorium of SODRE (Radio Broadcasting ServiceOfficer ). His participation in this space served him as a stepping stone to be invited, in early 1966, at recognized Festival of Cosquín, in Argentina, again in 1985.

On February 29, 1968, he married Nancy Marino, with whom he had his eldest daughter Carla Moriana January 27, 1970, and his youngest daughter María Serena on December 12, 1973

From the beginning, he was established as one of the great voices of Latin American popular song, with clear leftist and folkloric roots . He cultivated a contemptuous and manly style, and his thick voice and a typical accompaniment of guitars gave his hallmark.

He entered and adhered to the Frente Amplio of the Uruguayan left, fact which earned him ostracism and finally exile during the years of dictatorship. His songs were banned in Argentina, Chile and Uruguay during the dictatorial regimes that ruled those countries. He lived then successively in Argentina, Spain and Mexico, starting from February 9, 1976.

After the ban on his music was lifted, like that of so many in Argentina after the Falklands War, he settled again in Buenos Aires, where he gave three memorable concerts at the Arena Obras Sanitarias the first day of July 1983. Almost a year after he returned to his country, he had a massive reception in the historic concert of March 31, 1984, which was described by him as la experiencia más importante de mi vida ("the most important experience of my life").

Work 

Among the songs which became big hits are included Doña Soledad, (Miss Soledad), Crece desde el Pie (It grows from the foot), Recordándote (Remembering you), Stéfanie, Adagio a mi país (Adagio to my country), Zamba por vos (Zamba for you), Becho's violin and the poem by milonga Guitarra negra (Black Guitar).

As a poet, he was honored by the Inspectorate of Montevideo with the Municipal Poetry Award of 1959, for the book Explicaciones (Explanations), which he never wanted to publish.  In 1988 his storybook Por si el recuerdo (In case I remember), was published, containing stories written at various times during his life.

His life in his creations 

Like any artist, Alfredo Zitarrosa's work is nourished by several sources, however, when regarding Zitarrosa, the highly autobiographical nature of his compositions is a vital consideration. For example,Pájaro rival (Rival Bird), where he reflects a deep existential concern and even has a premonition of his approaching death, which occurred shortly after the end of the record. The recording is included on birds and souls, published posthumously in 1989:

That wound which speaks beyond doubt existential common to any human being, has to do with his particular personal history, which is reflected in Explicación de mi amor (Explanation of my love), a song which brings together elements of the three parents who had, primarily the biological one, who refused, and whose shadow pursued him all his life:

Or that he lived with his adoptive father, Carlos Durán, whom he accompanied in his last days. Years later, he recalled the episode: "Carlos no era mi padre y yo lo sabía. Era muy viejo para ser mi mejor amigo, pero cuando ya viudo me pidió que no lo abandonara, sentí que más que mi padrastro era mi hermano, y lo acompañé hasta el final, y lo enterré, con la ayuda de sus sobrinos auténticos, después de rescatarlo, desnudo, de la morgue del Hospital Militar. Su ataúd sonó como un bramido al dar un tumbo en el fondo del Panteón Policial del Buceo".

He paid tribute to the same Carlos Durán, who had been, among other trades, police ('' in the popular language) by necessity, dedicating one of its most emblematic, Chamarrita de los milicos (Chamarrita song about soldiers). He explains it this way: "[…] " "[…] was written at a stretch in a bar table of Bvar. Artigas and July 18, January 27, 1970. That day my daughter Carla Moriana was born and I felt I was writing to the one who could not be his grandfather, my adoptive father, Carlos Durán, who being the son of a Colonel 'Colorado', had ended up being a 'milico' in the 1940s. Poor as we were, I remember the large revolver of my father unloaded, which he kept in a drawer of the 'trinchante', after taking off his 'straps' every night or every morning, depending on the shifts. The bullets, always separated, smelled all the things kept there by my mother. I couldn't imagine how they were opened, or what the hell they had inside which was so dangerous. But those bullets and that gun, the luxury of that humble home, a property of the government – so I was told – which my father was carrying as a punishment not exempt of a certain hesitant pride."

Many of his songs reflected also his knowledge of the countryside and rural areas, acquired during his childhood in his frequent visits to his mother's adoptive brothers, especially his uncle José Pepe Carbajal. He said: "". In my vacations, in the summertime, I always went to the heart of the country, to the city of Trinidad, capital of the department of Flores, who is perhaps the most backward of these interior departments of the country, an area which depends predominantly on cattle breeding and growing, of large estates [...] As far as I remember I spent there the three summer months, from my childhood until I was 12 years old, from. There, of course, I learned everything I know about the countryside chores, although later I lived in the countryside too, but as a teenager. I learned to ride on horseback, to milk; countryside.stuff.. how to hunt".
This made attendance to take special preference for music jacket, and that will permeate his personality with campesino traits, giving more elements to his creations. The milonga Mi tierra en invierno (My land in winter) is one of them, which shows his knowledge of the various facets of rural life.

The attachment to the horse and his special care, as an essential element in the daily tasks:

The chores with livestock:

Pests:

Or the times of harvest:

In his early youth, and as tired announcer on the radio, in Montevideo, his artistic call begins to awake and passion for Boheme, and the night and its ghosts. These are times of various experiments, testing his ability in different art fields. The core of that stage of his life takes place in the Barrio Sur (South District), where he lives in a house in front of a square, which also neighbours the cemetery; that black place-neighborhood, candombe, carnival, call, humble people, solidarity and fraternal-left its mark on the sensitivity of young Alfredo Zitarrosa, which is, historically, a particular inclination : apparently wants more, displayed as a serious and circumspect person, for the sake of doing so and also, perhaps, pretend have always because of his youth. That got to the point of being an obsession, which made him wear glasses, which he did not need for the purpose of increasing his apparent age. Over time, and in his profession as a singer, he always presented himself in his performances, somewhere outside, dressed in the traditional manner, wearing a suit and a tie and having a strictly formal appearance.

Shown elements and circumstances relating to this stage of his life in several songs, one of them is Coplas del canto (Poems of the song), where states:

And in one of his most recognized songs, Candombe del olvido (Candombe of oblivion), composed many years later, which is based almost entirely on the evocation of that time:

Other texts 

Fragment Guitarra Negra (Black Guitar):

Excerpt from El Violín de Becho (Becho's fiddle):

See also 
Atahualpa Yupanqui (Argentinian, with a comparable style)
Mercedes Sosa
Los Olimareños
Music of Uruguay

References

External links 

Alfredo Zitarrosa. Biography, published in The Republic on January 17, 1998, by Eduardo Erro (Spanish)
Official site of the Foundation Zitarrosa (Spanish)
Discography and songbook Alfredo Zitarrosa

1936 births
1989 deaths
People from Montevideo
Uruguayan people of Basque descent
20th-century Uruguayan male singers
Uruguayan communists
Uruguayan journalists
Uruguayan folklorists
20th-century Uruguayan poets
Uruguayan male poets
Uruguayan songwriters
Male songwriters
Male singer-songwriters
Uruguayan exiles
Uruguayan expatriates in Argentina
Uruguayan expatriates in Mexico
Uruguayan expatriates in Spain
20th-century journalists